Star of the Sea High School or "SSHS" is a parochial high school in the coastal Municipality of Tukuran, Philippines. Previously controlled by the Missionary Society of St. Columban, Star of the Sea is run by Roman Catholic Diocese of Pagadian as with the other Diocesan Schools of Pagadian.

Basic Information
Rev. Fr. Kenneth Koster, a priest, founded the school in 1967.

Sister Schools
 Saint Columban College in Pagadian City
 Holy Child Academy in Pagadian City
 Immaculate Heart Academy in Dumalinao, Zamboanga del Sur

External links
 Catholic Educational Association of the Philippines

Catholic elementary schools in the Philippines
High schools in the Philippines
Schools in Zamboanga del Sur